Natalia Dicenta Herrera (born 6 July 1962) is a Spanish actress and singer.

Family 
She was born in Madrid on 6 July 1962. On her father side, she is the granddaughter of actor , and great-granddaughter of playwright Joaquín Dicenta. Natalia also has a younger brother, named Daniel, a photographer. Her parents married in 1960 and divorced in 1967. She has worked with her mother Lola in many occasions.

Filmography

Film
 Propiedad privada (2006)
 Mujeres en el parque (2006)
 La monja (2005)
 Cásate conmigo, Maribel (2002)
 ¡Hasta aquí hemos llegado! (2002)
 El florido pensil (2002)
 The Dancer Upstairs (2002)
 Gatos (2002)
 Zapping (1999)
 Entre las piernas (1999) (voice)
 Grandes ocasiones (1998)
 Al límite (1997) (voice)
 En brazos de la mujer madura (1997) (voice)
 Malena es un nombre de tango (1996) (voice)
 Un paraguas para tres (1992)
 Las edades de Lulú (1990) (voice)

Television
 El internado: Las cumbres (2021)
 Fuera de lugar (2008)
 La Mandrágora (2007)
 7 vidas (2003)
 El comisario (2002)
 Robles, investigador (2000–2001)
 Telepasión española (1999)
 Función de noche (1996)
 La zapatera prodigiosa (1995)
 ¡Ay, Señor, Señor! (1995)
 Primera función (1989)
 Nunca se sabe (1986)
 Media naranja (1986)
 Lecciones de tocador (1983)
 Historias para no dormir (1982)
 El teatro (1974)
 Estudio 1 (1973–1983)

Discography

Soundtrack albums
 2002: V premios Max de las artes escénicas (live)

Awards 
 Ourense Independent Film Festival
2007: Best Actress in Short Film (for Propiedad privada)
 Fotogramas de Plata
1994: Best Actress (for La zapatera prodigiosa)
 Unión de Actores
1994: Best Actress (for Un tranvía llamdo deseo)
 Premios Max
1997: Best Actress (for A bocados)

References

External links

1962 births
Living people
Actresses from Madrid
Spanish film actresses
Spanish television actresses
Spanish voice actresses
Spanish stage actresses
Spanish women singers
20th-century Spanish actresses
21st-century Spanish actresses